Ohannes Tchekidjian (born January 23, 1929) is an Armenian composer and conductor and a recipient of both USSR State Prize and People's Artist of USSR.

Biography
Tchekidjian was born in Istanbul, Turkey and attended Mekhitaryan School there for seven years.

From 1941 to 1947 he attended French College of Saint Michel and from 1944 to 1951 worked at both Istanbul Conservatory as faculty conductor and as a conductor of the Duryan Choir. From 1951 to 1953 he attended lectures of professor Jean Fournet at the École Normale de Musique de Paris and during the same years have attended Institute of Chemistry where he obtained a minor degree in chemical engineering.

In 1961 he took postgraduate lessons at the Istanbul Conservatory and then mover to Armenia where he worked with the State Academic Choir. Prior to it, he was artistic director and chief conductor of the State Choir of Istanbul, a music director of the Süreyya Opera House, and was a founder and conductor of his own choir. In 1969 he was awarded an Academic title from the Armenian State Choir and six years later got an Honoured title as well. Since 1975 he works at the Komitas State Conservatory in Yerevan where he became a professor by 1982, and from that year till 1987 was a director and chief conductor of the Spendiaryan Academic State Theatre of Opera & Ballet in the same place. Besides being a composer and conductor he also had some political influence in Armenia. From 1975 to 1990 he was a member of Armenian National Assembly in the Armenian Soviet Socialist Republic and then was promoted to Supreme Soviet of the Soviet Union membership where he served from 1979 to 1984. On April 27, 2010 he conducted Requiem by Wolfgang Amadeus Mozart at the Saint Gregory the Illuminator Cathedral, Yerevan which Supreme Patriarch Karekin II have attended.

EDUCATION

COMMUNITY SERVICE 
Has never been a member of a Political Party at any  time

PROFESSIONAL BACKGROUND

WORLD TOURS OUT OF THE USSR

References

1929 births
Living people
Armenian politicians
Armenian composers
Armenian conductors (music)
20th-century composers
20th-century conductors (music)
Musicians from Istanbul
21st-century conductors (music)